Boris Konstantinovich Ratnikov is a retired Major-General of the reserves of Russia's Federal Security Service. He was a key figure in the protection of the President of Russia. He has authored a large number of publications and books on the history of domestic intelligence services. He participated in a documentary film "The Call of the Abyss" and "Storm of consciousness", which aroused wide public interest in Russia.

Life and career 
Ratnikov was born June 11, 1944 in the village of Kurovo, Lukhovitsky district, Moscow region. His father was the director of an agricultural enterprise. In 1969, he graduated from the Moscow Aviation Institute in the specialty department of management systems of aircraft. After his graduation from the institute, Ratnikov worked as an engineer. In 1984, he graduated from the "Red Flag" school for KGB officers with a degree in higher professional education and knowledge of the Persian language.

In the 1980s, Ratnikov went on a business trip to Afghanistan as an adviser of KHAD, took part in the hostilities, awarded orders and medals. He worked in the 4th Service Directorate of the KGB in Moscow and Moscow region. From 1991-1994, he was the first Deputy Chief of the General Directorate of guard Russian Federation. In May 1994, he was appointed chief advisor to the President of the Security Service of Russia. From 1996-1997, he served as the chief adviser to the Federal Security Service of Russia.

Ratnikov has researched telepathy, clairvoyance, hypnosis, applied psychology, parapsychology, telekinesis, astrology etc. He claims that the portrayal of parapsychology as a "false" science was created intentionally. Working in state research institutes and private laboratories, he conducted secret experiments for war on extrasensory perception between intelligence services of the CIA and the KGB.

Until 2003, Ratnikov was an adviser to the head of the Moscow Regional Duma. He is now in retirement (Major-General reserves of the Federal Security Service of the Russian Federation). He is a member of the Committee of Commerce and Industry Chamber of Business Security and the head of the Energy-information laboratory (research in the field of parapsychology) of the Academy of the National Association of bodyguards (abbreviation )

In December 2006, Ratnikov told Rossiyskaya Gazeta that his mind-reading work revealed that Madeleine Albright "was indignant that Russia held the world's largest reserves of natural resources." Some Russian officials have presented his claim as a real statement by Albright.

Publications
Б. К. Ратников (Boris Ratnikov), Г. Г. Рогозин Georgy Ragozin, Д. Н. Фонарев, «За гранью познанного», изд. «ВеГа» (НАСТ России), 2008 г.  (УДК 004—027.21 ББК 32.81 P25); ("Abroad the knowledge") 
Б. К. Ратников (Boris Ratnikov), Г. Г. Рогозин Georgy Ragozin, Д. Н. Фонарев, «За гранью познанного», изд. «Академия управления», серия «Хроники реального мира», г. Москва, 2010 г. ; ("Abroad the knowledge", series "Chronicles of the real world") 
Б. К. Ратников (Boris Ratnikov), Г. Г. Рогозин Georgy Ragozin, "Картина мира в представлении спецслужб",  (Painting the world in the representation of special services) 
Б. К. Edwin C. May, Victor Rubel, Joseph W. McMoneagle, Boris Ratnikov, Georgy Ragozin and Loyd Auerbach, "ESP Wars: East & West" ("Пси-войны. Запад и Восток. История в свидетельствах очевидцев"),  (Painting the world in the representation of special services)  
Б. К. Ратников (Boris Ratnikov), "Родине (стихи)", Альманах «Лубянка», No.5, стр. 125-126; (Historical-journalistic Almanac "Lubyanka" - Motherland, poetry) 
Б. К. Ратников (Boris Ratnikov), "Кто с мечом на Руси появляется, от меча же ему погибать! Сотник стихов", Приложение к журналу «Спецназ». No.1,1996 г. (Magazine "Special Forces" - "Who will appear in Russia with a sword will die by the sword", centurion of poems)

Documentary films with his participation
"Зов бездны" ("The Call of the Abyss") 
"Штурм сознания" Громкое дело ("Storm of consciousness" High-profile case).

References

External links

 Интервью Руководителя Энергоинформационной лаборатории Академии НАСТ России генерал-майора запаса ФСО Ратникова Б.К. журналу «Вопросы безопасности» от 29 августа 2010 года (© 2009-2012 "QSec. Вопросы безопасности") Информационно-аналитический портал; (Magazine "Security Considerations" - Interview with Mr. Boris Ratnikov) 
Историко-публицистический альманах "Лубянка", РАТНИКОВ Борис Константинович; (Historical-journalistic Almanac "Lubyanka" - about Mr. Boris Ratnikov) 
"Лабиринт", РАТНИКОВ Борис Константинович; ("Labyrinth" - Mr. Boris Ratnikov) 
Установки, превращающие людей в зомби; (Guidelines that turn people into zombies) 
Группы боевой экстрасенсорики (Groups of combat of extrasensory); 
Новая книга Б.К.Ратникова и Г.Г.Рогозина; (New Book from Mr. Boris Ratnikov and Mr. Georgy Ragozin) 
Военные маги; (Military mages) 
Психотронное оружие все-таки существует?; (Psychotronic weapons still exist) 
Пси-воины Генштаба; (Psi-warriors of the General Staff) 
Экстрасенсы ФСБ предсказали будущее России; (Psychics  FSB predict the future of Russia) 
Астральный отдел ФСБ; (Astral department of the FSB) 

1944 births
Living people
KGB officers
People of the Federal Security Service
Parapsychologists
Federal Security Service officers